The Kluchor birch mouse (Sicista kluchorica) is a species of rodent in the family Sminthidae. It is endemic to Russia. Its natural habitat is temperate forests.

References

Sicista
Mammals of Russia
Endemic fauna of Russia
Taxonomy articles created by Polbot
Mammals described in 1980